Empfindsamkeit is German for sensibility and may refer to:
 Sentimentalism (literature)
 Empfindsamkeit (music) (English: Sensitive style), or Empfindsamer Stil a composition style in 18th-century German music